Felix Rácz (born 1973 in Satu Mare, Romania) is the founder of Felix Promotion, a sports and television promotional firm. He has lived in Hungary since 1991. He speaks Hungarian, English, French and Romanian.

References

http://www.nemzetisport.hu/okolvivas/okolvivas-racz-felix-leigazolta-bedak-zsoltot-ujra-tv-s-galak-lehetnek-2215771
https://archive.today/20140508140112/http://totalextrem.hu/hir/budapestet-is-meghoditja-a-fighters-run
https://web.archive.org/web/20140420194254/http://www.budopest.hu/magazin/a-barba-negra-ismet-telthazas-bokszgalanak-ad-otthont/1569
http://www.profiboksz.hu/video/racz-felix-volt-a-dino-sporthirado-vendege-video/
http://sport.hir24.hu/kuzdosportok/2013/09/09/jo-kezekbe-kerult-az-okolvivas-nepszerusitese/ 
Szekszárdi Vasárnap, Sikeres évet zárt a szekszárdi sportmenedzser, 2012, p. 13.
Nemzeti Sport, A nagy visszatérés, 2010, p. 14.
Napló, A menedzser, 2011, p. 16.
Dunaújvárosi Hírhozó, Rácz a menedzser, 2010, p. 11.

Romanian businesspeople
1973 births
Living people